Minuscule 389 (in the Gregory-Aland numbering), ε 105 (Soden), is a Greek minuscule manuscript of the New Testament, on parchment. Paleographically it has been assigned to the 11th century. 
It has marginalia.

Description 
The codex contains the text of the four Gospels on 197 parchment leaves, written in one column per page, 23 lines per page.

There is also a division according to the Ammonian Sections, with references to the Eusebian Canons (written below Ammonian Section numbers).

Text 

Hermann von Soden classified it to the textual family Ικ. Kurt Aland the Greek text of the codex did not place in any Category.

According to the Claremont Profile Method it belongs to the textual family Πa in Luke 1, Luke 10, and Luke 20, as a weak member.

History 
The manuscript together with 386, 388, and 390 belonged to Giovanni Angelo Herzog von Altaemps (died 1627).

The manuscript was added to the list of New Testament manuscripts by Scholz (1794–1852).
It was examined and described by Giuseppe Cozza-Luzi.
C. R. Gregory saw it in 1886.

As of 2009, the manuscript is housed at the Vatican Library (Ottob. gr. 297) in Rome.

See also 
List of New Testament minuscules
Biblical manuscript
Textual criticism

References

Further reading 

 

Greek New Testament minuscules
11th-century biblical manuscripts
Manuscripts of the Vatican Library